The 1916 United States presidential election in Colorado took place on November 7, 1916. All contemporary forty-eight states were part of the 1916 United States presidential election. State voters chose six electors to the Electoral College, who voted for president and vice president.

Although Colorado was following statehood Republican-leaning, Populist support in silver-mining regions, was overwhelmingly transferred to William Jennings Bryan in 1896 and maintained in the following four elections, when the Republicans won only in the 1904 landslide of Theodore Roosevelt, and even then Colorado was the only western state where more than a couple of counties retained their Bryanite Democratic loyalties with Alton Parker as the nominee.

Moreover, in contrast to the East where supporters of Theodore Roosevelt's "Bull Moose" Party from the 1912 election rapidly returned to the Republicans, in the Mountain States many if not most of these supporters turned to the Democratic Party not only in presidential elections, but also in state and federal legislative ones. Another factor helping Wilson was a powerful "peace vote" in the Western states due to opposition to participation in World War I, and a third was that a considerable part of the substantial vote for Eugene Debs from the previous election was turned over to Woodrow Wilson owing to such Progressive reforms as the Sixteenth and Seventeenth Amendments.

These factors combined to give Wilson a powerful victory over Republican nominee Charles Evans Hughes. Wilson won by 25.99 percentage points and carried every county except Sedgwick (albeit losing by ten votes), the furthest northeast, which had also been one of two counties to back Roosevelt four years earlier. This is the second-best Democratic margin in Colorado presidential election history behind Bryan’s five-to-one win in the “free silver” 1896 election, although Lyndon B. Johnson would exceed Wilson’s vote share in 1964.

Full results

Results by county

References

1916
Colorado
1916 Colorado elections